Oluwadurotimi Ayodeji O. Segun, known as Rotimi Segun (born 28 December 1996) is an English professional rugby union player for Saracens in Premiership Rugby.  His usual position is wing.

Segun made his first Premiership Rugby appearance for Saracens in February 2018 after appearing for Loughborough Students in National League 1 on loan. He will remain at Saracens until at least 2023.

References

1996 births
Living people
English rugby union players
Saracens F.C. players
Rugby union wings
Loughborough Students RUFC players
People educated at Northampton School for Boys
People educated at Stowe School
Rugby union players from Enfield